Blackrock railway station is in Blackrock, Dublin, Ireland.

Blackrock railway station may also refer to:
Blackrock railway station (County Cork), in Blackrock, Cork, Ireland
Black Rock Halt railway station, in Gwynedd, Wales
Black Rock Station on the Volk's Electric Railway in Brighton

See also
Black Rock (disambiguation)